NGC 705 is a lenticular galaxy located 240 million light-years away in the constellation Andromeda. The galaxy was discovered by astronomer William Herschel on September 21, 1786 and is also a member of Abell 262.

Although NGC 705 is an early type galaxy, it has a dust lane that is concentrated toward its central region.

See also
 List of NGC objects (1–1000)

References

External links

705
6958
Andromeda (constellation)
Astronomical objects discovered in 1786
Lenticular galaxies
Abell 262
1345